was a Japanese video game company founded in 1994 that is famous for developing arcade shoot 'em ups.

Following Toaplan's bankruptcy, some of the former staff went to Takumi. Among Toaplan's offshoots, only Takumi has developed any sequels to former Toaplan games.

Takumi is one of the splinter companies formed when the company Toaplan disbanded in 1994, the others being Cave, 8ing/Raizing, and Gazelle.

The company had also produced soundtrack albums.

Developed products

Video games
 Twin Cobra II (Kyukyoku Tiger II) (1995)
 Tsunahiki Wars (1995)
 Mahō Juku: Magic Master (cancelled; co-developed with Saurus)
 Giga Wing (1999)
 Giga Wing 2 (2000)
 Mars Matrix: Hyper Solid Shooting (2000)
 Night Raid (2001)
 Weather Tales (Otenki Kororin) (2001)
 Don Chan Puzzle: Hanabi de Don! (2003; co-developed with Aruze)
 Kurukuru Fever (2003; co-developed with Aruze)
 Giga Wing Generations (2004)
 Elemental Monster
 Milon no Hoshizora Shabon: Puzzle Kumikyoku (2006)
 Fishing Master (2007)
 Fishing Master World Tour (2008)
 Mesaze!! Tsuri Master DS (2009)

Medal games
 Crusher Mako-chan (1999)
 Horutoru Bomber (1999)
 Koro Koro Quest (1999)
 Shuffle Gakuen (Unknown)

Prize games
 4x4 Rally
 Bingo de Bingo!
 Go! Go! Pen-Suke
 Rolling Soccer

Soundtracks
 "Kyuukyouku Tiger II" Official soundtrack
 "Giga Wing" Official soundtrack
 "Mars Matrix/Giga Wing 2" Official soundtrack
 "Night Raid" Official soundtrack
 "Blast! Shooting Game Sound Omnibus Vol.1"

References

External links
  via Internet Archive

Amusement companies of Japan
Video game companies established in 1994
Defunct video game companies of Japan
Video game development companies